Yamaha MT-15 is a motorcycle manufactured by Yamaha since 2018. It is based on the Yamaha YZF-R15, with 155cc water-cooled single-cylinder engine equipped with the mainframe and variable valve timing mechanism (VVA), the inverted front fork, etc. The exterior parts are specially designed, but the shape of the front mask is based on the Yamaha MT-09 from the 2017 model.

Overview 
Started manufactured in Thailand in December 2018. Then January 2019 in Indonesia. Indonesia's specifications are also exported to the Philippines and Vietnam. Started manufactured in Malaysia in November 2020.

Manufactured in India from April 2019, with same engine body and frame design from Thailand's specifications, with differences on several parts such as the front fork, swing arm, wheel size, etc. Although the shape is quite similar except for telescopic front fork in terms of appearance, the ABS are standard equipment for India's specifications.

References

External links 

  (India)

Yamaha motorcycles
Motorcycles introduced in 2018
Standard motorcycles